"Information wants to be free" is an expression that means all people should be able to access information freely. It is often used by technology activists to criticize laws that limit transparency and general access to information. People who criticize intellectual property law say the system of such government-granted monopolies conflicts with the development of a public domain of information. The expression is often credited to Stewart Brand, who was recorded saying it at a hackers conference in 1984.

History
The phrase is attributed to Stewart Brand, who, in the late 1960s, founded the Whole Earth Catalog and argued that technology could be liberating rather than oppressing. What is considered the earliest recorded occurrence of the expression was at the first Hackers Conference in 1984, although the video recording of the conversation shows that what Brand actually said is slightly different. Brand told Steve Wozniak: 

Brand's conference remarks are transcribed accurately by Joshua Gans in his research on the quote as used by Steve Levy in his own history of the phrase. 

A later form appears in his The Media Lab: Inventing the Future at MIT: 

According to historian Adrian Johns, the slogan expresses a view that had already been articulated in the mid-20th century by Norbert Wiener, Michael Polanyi and Arnold Plant, who advocated for the free communication of scientific knowledge, and specifically criticized the patent system.

Gratis versus libre

The various forms of the original statement are ambiguous: the slogan can be used to argue the benefits of propertied information, of liberated, free, and open information, or of both. It can be taken amorally as an expression of a fact of information-science: once information has passed to a new location outside of the source's control there is no way of ensuring it is not propagated further, and therefore will naturally tend towards a state where that information is widely distributed.  Much of its force is due to the anthropomorphic metaphor that imputes desire to information.  In 1990 Richard Stallman restated the concept normatively, without the anthropomorphization:

Stallman's reformulation incorporates a political stance into Brand's value-neutral observation of social trends.

Cypherpunk

Brand's attribution of will to an abstract human construct (information) has been adopted within a branch of the cypherpunk movement, whose members espouse a particular political viewpoint (anarchism). The construction of the statement takes its meaning beyond the simple judgmental observation, "Information should be free", by acknowledging that the internal force or entelechy of information and knowledge makes it essentially incompatible with notions of proprietary software, copyrights, patents, subscription services, etc. They believe that information is dynamic, ever-growing and evolving and cannot be contained within (any) ideological structure.

According to this philosophy, hackers, crackers, and phreakers are liberators of information which is being held hostage by agents demanding money for its release. Other participants in this network include cypherpunks who educate people to use public-key cryptography to protect the privacy of their messages from corporate or governmental snooping and programmers who write free software and open source code. Still others create Free-Nets allowing users to gain access to computer resources for which they would otherwise need an account. They might also break copyright law by swapping music, movies, or other copyrighted materials over the Internet.

Chelsea Manning is alleged to have said "Information should be free" to Adrian Lamo when explaining a rationale for US government documents to be released to WikiLeaks. The narrative goes on with Manning wondering if she is a "'hacker', 'cracker', 'hacktivist', 'leaker' or what".

Literary usage
In the "Fall Revolution" series of science-fiction books, author Ken Macleod riffs and puns on the expression by writing about entities composed of information actually "wanting", as in desiring, freedom and the machinations of several human characters with differing political and ideological agendas, to facilitate or disrupt these entities' quest for freedom.

In the cyberpunk world of post-singularity transhuman culture described by Charles Stross in his books like Accelerando and Singularity Sky, the wish of information to be free is a law of nature.

See also

Crypto-anarchism
Culture vs. Copyright
Cypherpunk
Free content
Free culture movement
Freedom of information
Free Haven Project
Freenet
Free software
Hacktivism
Hacktivismo
Horror vacui (physics)
Information activist
Information Doesn't Want to Be Free
Internet censorship
Internet privacy
Openness
Paywall
Streisand effect
Tor (anonymity network)
Transparency

References

External links
Does the cyberpunk movement represent a political resistance?
Roger Clarke

Adages
English phrases
Free content
Open content
Quotations from science
1984 neologisms